Huaiyang is a town of Yuanshi County in southwestern Hebei province, China, located adjacent to the county seat. , it has 29 villages under its administration.

See also
List of township-level divisions of Hebei

References

Township-level divisions of Hebei